Kung Chao-Yuan (1836 – July 20, 1897) was a Chinese Ambassador.
In 1888 he was Shanghai Custom Taotai responsible for the public investment in the Huahsin Spinning and Weaving Company in Shanghai.
From 1893 to 1896 he was sent by Li Hongzhang as ambassador to the Court of St James's and was concurrently accredited in Rome.
In London he trapped Sun Yat-sen in his legation, but had to release him under British pressure. 
In 1896 he left London already seriously ill.

References

1836 births
1897 deaths
Ambassadors of China to the United Kingdom
Ambassadors of China to Italy